This is a list of the bird species recorded in Somalia. The avifauna of Somalia include a total of 685 species, of which eight are endemic, and 3 have been introduced by humans.

This list's taxonomic treatment (designation and sequence of orders, families and species) and nomenclature (common and scientific names) follow the conventions of The Clements Checklist of Birds of the World, 2022 edition. The family accounts at the beginning of each heading reflect this taxonomy, as do the species counts found in each family account. Introduced and accidental species are included in the total counts for Somalia.

The following tags have been used to highlight several categories, but not all species fall into one of these categories.

(A) Accidental - a species that rarely or accidentally occurs in Somalia
(E) Endemic - a species endemic to Somalia
(I) Introduced - a species introduced to Somalia as a consequence, direct or indirect, of human actions

Ostriches
Order: StruthioniformesFamily: Struthionidae

The ostrich is a flightless bird native to Africa. It is the largest living species of bird. It is distinctive in its appearance, with a long neck and legs and the ability to run at high speeds.

Common ostrich, Struthio camelus
Somali ostrich, Struthio molybdophanes

Ducks, geese, and waterfowl
Order: AnseriformesFamily: Anatidae

Anatidae includes the ducks and most duck-like waterfowl, such as geese and swans. These birds are adapted to an aquatic existence with webbed feet, flattened bills, and feathers that are excellent at shedding water due to an oily coating.

White-faced whistling-duck, Dendrocygna viduata
Fulvous whistling-duck, Dendrocygna bicolor
White-backed duck, Thalassornis leuconotus (A)
Knob-billed duck, Sarkidiornis melanotos
Egyptian goose, Alopochen aegyptiacus
Ruddy shelduck, Tadorna ferruginea (A)
African pygmy-goose, Nettapus auritus
Garganey, Spatula querquedula
Blue-billed teal, Spatula hottentota (A)
Northern shoveler, Spatula clypeata
Gadwall, Mareca strepera (A)
Eurasian wigeon, Mareca penelope (A)
Yellow-billed duck, Anas undulata (A)
Red-billed duck, Anas erythrorhyncha
Northern pintail, Anas acuta
Green-winged teal, Anas crecca
Southern pochard, Netta erythrophthalma
Tufted duck, Aythya fuligula (A)

Guineafowl
Order: GalliformesFamily: Numididae

Guineafowl are a group of African, seed-eating, ground-nesting birds that resemble partridges, but with featherless heads and spangled grey plumage. 

Helmeted guineafowl, Numida meleagris
Vulturine guineafowl, Acryllium vulturinum
Eastern crested guineafowl, Guttera pucherani

Pheasants, grouse, and allies
Order: GalliformesFamily: Phasianidae

The Phasianidae are a family of terrestrial birds which consists of quails, partridges, snowcocks, francolins, spurfowls, tragopans, monals, pheasants, peafowls and jungle fowls. In general, they are plump (although they vary in size) and have broad, relatively short wings.

Crested francolin, Ortygornis sephaena
Orange River francolin, Scleroptila gutturalis
Common quail, Coturnix  coturnix (A)
Harlequin quail, Coturnix delegorguei
Chestnut-naped francolin, Pternistis castaneicollis
Yellow-necked spurfowl, Pternistis leucoscepus

Flamingos
Order: PhoenicopteriformesFamily: Phoenicopteridae

Flamingos filter-feed on shellfish and algae. Their oddly shaped beaks are specially adapted to separate mud and silt from the food they consume and, uniquely, are used upside-down. 

Greater flamingo, Phoenicopterus roseus
Lesser flamingo, Phoenicopterus minor (A)

Grebes
Order: PodicipediformesFamily: Podicipedidae

Grebes are small to medium-large freshwater diving birds. They have lobed toes and are excellent swimmers and divers. However, they have their feet placed far back on the body, making them quite ungainly on land.

Little grebe, Tachybaptus ruficollis
Eared grebe, Podiceps nigricollis (A)

Pigeons and doves
Order: ColumbiformesFamily: Columbidae

Pigeons and doves are stout-bodied birds with short necks and short slender bills with a fleshy cere.

Rock pigeon, Columba livia (I)
Speckled pigeon, Columba guinea
Somali pigeon, Columba oliviae (E)
Rameron pigeon, Columba arquatrix
European turtle-dove, Streptopelia turtur
Dusky turtle-dove, Streptopelia lugens
African collared-dove, Streptopelia roseogrisea
White-winged collared-dove, Streptopelia reichenowi
Mourning collared-dove, Streptopelia decipiens
Red-eyed dove, Streptopelia semitorquata
Ring-necked dove, Streptopelia capicola
Laughing dove, Streptopelia senegalensis
Emerald-spotted wood-dove, Turtur chalcospilos
Tambourine dove, Turtur tympanistria
Namaqua dove, Oena capensis
Bruce's green-pigeon, Treron waalia

Sandgrouse
Order: PterocliformesFamily: Pteroclidae

Sandgrouse have small, pigeon like heads and necks, but sturdy compact bodies. They have long pointed wings and sometimes tails and a fast direct flight. Flocks fly to watering holes at dawn and dusk. Their legs are feathered down to the toes.

Chestnut-bellied sandgrouse, Pterocles exustus
Spotted sandgrouse, Pterocles senegallus
Black-faced sandgrouse, Pterocles decoratus
Lichtenstein's sandgrouse, Pterocles lichtensteinii

Bustards
Order: OtidiformesFamily: Otididae

Bustards are large terrestrial birds mainly associated with dry open country and steppes in the Old World. They are omnivorous and nest on the ground. They walk steadily on strong legs and big toes, pecking for food as they go. They have long broad wings with "fingered" wingtips and striking patterns in flight. Many have interesting mating displays.

Arabian bustard, Ardeotis arabs (A)
Kori bustard, Ardeotis kori
Heuglin's bustard, Neotis heuglinii
White-bellied bustard, Eupodotis senegalensis
Little brown bustard, Eupodotis humilis
Buff-crested bustard, Lophotis gindiana
Black-bellied bustard, Lissotis melanogaster
Hartlaub's bustard, Lissotis hartlaubii

Turacos
Order: MusophagiformesFamily: Musophagidae

The turacos, plantain eaters and go-away-birds make up the bird family Musophagidae. They are medium-sized arboreal birds. The turacos and plantain eaters are brightly coloured, usually in blue, green or purple. The go-away birds are mostly grey and white. 

Fischer's turaco, Tauraco fischeri
White-bellied go-away-bird, Corythaixoides leucogaster

Cuckoos
Order: CuculiformesFamily: Cuculidae

The family Cuculidae includes cuckoos, roadrunners and anis. These birds are of variable size with slender bodies, long tails and strong legs. The Old World cuckoos are brood parasites.

White-browed coucal, Centropus superciliosus
Green malkoha, Ceuthmochares australis
Great spotted cuckoo, Clamator glandarius
Levaillant's cuckoo, Clamator levaillantii (A)
Pied cuckoo, Clamator jacobinus
Dideric cuckoo, Chrysococcyx caprius
Klaas's cuckoo, Chrysococcyx klaas
Black cuckoo, Cuculus clamosus (A)
Red-chested cuckoo, Cuculus solitarius (A)
Lesser cuckoo, Cuculus poliocephalus (A)
African cuckoo, Cuculus gularis
Common cuckoo, Cuculus canorus

Nightjars and allies
Order: CaprimulgiformesFamily: Caprimulgidae

Nightjars are medium-sized nocturnal birds that usually nest on the ground. They have long wings, short legs and very short bills. Most have small feet, of little use for walking, and long pointed wings. Their soft plumage is camouflaged to resemble bark or leaves. 

Pennant-winged nightjar, Caprimulgus vexillarius (A)
Standard-winged nightjar, Caprimulgus longipennis (A)
Eurasian nightjar, Caprimulgus europaeus
Sombre nightjar, Caprimulgus fraenatus
Egyptian nightjar, Caprimulgus aegyptius (A)
Nubian nightjar, Caprimulgus nubicus
Donaldson-Smith's nightjar, Caprimulgus donaldsoni
Plain nightjar, Caprimulgus inornatus
Star-spotted nightjar, Caprimulgus stellatus (A)
Slender-tailed nightjar, Caprimulgus clarus

Swifts
Order: CaprimulgiformesFamily: Apodidae

Swifts are small birds which spend the majority of their lives flying. These birds have very short legs and never settle voluntarily on the ground, perching instead only on vertical surfaces. Many swifts have long swept-back wings which resemble a crescent or boomerang.

Mottled spinetail, Telacanthura ussheri (A)
Bat-like spinetail, Neafrapus boehmi (A)
Alpine swift, Apus melba
Common swift, Apus apus (A)
Nyanza swift, Apus niansae
Forbes-Watson's swift, Apus berliozi
Little swift, Apus affinis
Horus swift, Apus horus (A)
White-rumped swift, Apus caffer
African palm-swift, Cypsiurus parvus

Flufftails
Order: GruiformesFamily: Sarothruridae

The flufftails are a small family of ground-dwelling birds found only in Madagascar and sub-Saharan Africa.

Buff-spotted flufftail, Sarothrura elegans (A)

Rails, gallinules, and coots
Order: GruiformesFamily: Rallidae

Rallidae is a large family of small to medium-sized birds which includes the rails, crakes, coots and gallinules. Typically they inhabit dense vegetation in damp environments near lakes, swamps or rivers. In general they are shy and secretive birds, making them difficult to observe. Most species have strong legs and long toes which are well adapted to soft uneven surfaces. They tend to have short, rounded wings and to be weak fliers.

Corn crake, Crex crex (A)
Spotted crake, Porzana porzana (A)
Eurasian moorhen, Gallinula chloropus
Red-knobbed coot, Fulica cristata (A)
Allen's gallinule, Porphyrio alleni (A)
African swamphen, Porphyrio madagascariensis (A)
Black crake, Zapornia flavirostris
Little crake, Zapornia parva (A)
Baillon's crake, Zapornia pusilla (A)

Finfoots
Order: GruiformesFamily: Heliornithidae

Heliornithidae is a small family of tropical birds with webbed lobes on their feet similar to those of grebes and coots. 

African finfoot, Podica senegalensis (A)

Thick-knees
Order: CharadriiformesFamily: Burhinidae

The thick-knees are a group of largely tropical waders in the family Burhinidae. They are found worldwide within the tropical zone, with some species also breeding in temperate Europe and Australia. They are medium to large waders with strong black or yellow-black bills, large yellow eyes and cryptic plumage. Despite being classed as waders, most species have a preference for arid or semi-arid habitats.

Water thick-knee, Burhinus vermiculatus
Eurasian thick-knee, Burhinus oedicnemus
Indian thick-knee, Burhinus indicus (A)
Senegal thick-knee, Burhinus senegalensis (A)
Spotted thick-knee, Burhinus capensis

Stilts and avocets
Order: CharadriiformesFamily: Recurvirostridae

Recurvirostridae is a family of large wading birds, which includes the avocets and stilts. The avocets have long legs and long up-curved bills. The stilts have extremely long legs and long, thin, straight bills.

Black-winged stilt, Himantopus himantopus
Pied avocet, Recurvirostra avosetta

Oystercatchers
Order: CharadriiformesFamily: Haematopodidae

The oystercatchers are large and noisy plover-like birds, with strong bills used for smashing or prising open molluscs.

Eurasian oystercatcher, Haematopus ostralegus

Plovers and lapwings
Order: CharadriiformesFamily: Charadriidae

The family Charadriidae includes the plovers, dotterels and lapwings. They are small to medium-sized birds with compact bodies, short, thick necks and long, usually pointed, wings. They are found in open country worldwide, mostly in habitats near water.

Black-bellied plover, Pluvialis squatarola
Pacific golden-plover, Pluvialis fulva
Spur-winged lapwing, Vanellus spinosus
Black-headed lapwing, Vanellus tectus
Senegal lapwing, Vanellus lugubris
Black-winged lapwing, Vanellus melanopterus (A)
Crowned lapwing, Vanellus coronatus
Wattled lapwing, Vanellus senegallus (A)
Sociable lapwing, Vanellus gregarius (A)
Lesser sand-plover, Charadrius mongolus
Greater sand-plover, Charadrius leschenaultii
Caspian plover, Charadrius asiaticus
Kittlitz's plover, Charadrius pecuarius
Kentish plover, Charadrius alexandrinus
Common ringed plover, Charadrius hiaticula
Little ringed plover, Charadrius dubius
Three-banded plover, Charadrius tricollaris
White-fronted plover, Charadrius marginatus

Painted-snipes
Order: CharadriiformesFamily: Rostratulidae

Painted-snipes are short-legged, long-billed birds similar in shape to the true snipes, but more brightly coloured.

Greater painted-snipe, Rostratula benghalensis

Jacanas
Order: CharadriiformesFamily: Jacanidae

The jacanas are a group of tropical waders in the family Jacanidae. They are found throughout the tropics. They are identifiable by their huge feet and claws which enable them to walk on floating vegetation in the shallow lakes that are their preferred habitat. 

African jacana, Actophilornis africanus

Sandpipers and allies
Order: CharadriiformesFamily: Scolopacidae

Scolopacidae is a large diverse family of small to medium-sized shorebirds including the sandpipers, curlews, godwits, shanks, tattlers, woodcocks, snipes, dowitchers and phalaropes. The majority of these species eat small invertebrates picked out of the mud or soil. Variation in length of legs and bills enables multiple species to feed in the same habitat, particularly on the coast, without direct competition for food.

Whimbrel, Numenius phaeopus
Eurasian curlew, Numenius arquata
Bar-tailed godwit, Limosa lapponica
Black-tailed godwit, Limosa limosa
Ruddy turnstone, Arenaria interpres
Red knot, Calidris canutus (A)
Ruff, Calidris pugnax
Broad-billed sandpiper, Calidris falcinellus (A)
Curlew sandpiper, Calidris ferruginea
Temminck's stint, Calidris temminckii
Red-necked stint, Calidris ruficollis (A)
Sanderling, Calidris alba
Dunlin, Calidris alpina
Little stint, Calidris minuta
Jack snipe, Lymnocryptes minimus (A)
Great snipe, Gallinago media (A)
Common snipe, Gallinago gallinago
Pin-tailed snipe, Gallinago stenura (A)
Terek sandpiper, Xenus cinereus
Red-necked phalarope, Phalaropus lobatus
Common sandpiper, Actitis hypoleucos
Green sandpiper, Tringa ochropus
Spotted redshank, Tringa erythropus
Common greenshank, Tringa nebularia
Marsh sandpiper, Tringa stagnatilis
Wood sandpiper, Tringa glareola
Common redshank, Tringa totanus

Buttonquails
Order: CharadriiformesFamily: Turnicidae

The buttonquails are small, drab, running birds which resemble the true quails. The female is the brighter of the sexes and initiates courtship. The male incubates the eggs and tends the young.

Small buttonquail, Turnix sylvatica

Crab-plover
Order: CharadriiformesFamily: Dromadidae

The crab-plover is related to the waders. It resembles a plover but with very long grey legs and a strong heavy black bill similar to a tern. It has black-and-white plumage, a long neck, partially webbed feet and a bill designed for eating crabs.

Crab-plover, Dromas ardeola

Pratincoles and coursers
Order: CharadriiformesFamily: Glareolidae

Glareolidae is a family of wading birds comprising the pratincoles, which have short legs, long pointed wings and long forked tails, and the coursers, which have long legs, short wings and long, pointed bills which curve downwards.

Cream-colored courser, Cursorius cursor
Somali courser, Cursorius somalensis
Temminck's courser, Cursorius temminckii
Double-banded courser, Smutsornis africanus
Three-banded courser, Rhinoptilus cinctus
Collared pratincole, Glareola pratincola
Black-winged pratincole, Glareola nordmanni (A)
Madagascar pratincole, Glareola ocularis

Skuas and jaegers
Order: CharadriiformesFamily: Stercorariidae

The family Stercorariidae are, in general, medium to large birds, typically with grey or brown plumage, often with white markings on the wings. They nest on the ground in temperate and arctic regions and are long-distance migrants.

South polar skua, Stercorarius maccormicki (A)
Brown skua, Stercorarius antarctica (A)
Pomarine jaeger, Stercorarius pomarinus (A)
Parasitic jaeger, Stercorarius parasiticus

Gulls, terns, and skimmers
Order: CharadriiformesFamily: Laridae

Laridae is a family of medium to large seabirds, the gulls, terns, and skimmers. Gulls are typically grey or white, often with black markings on the head or wings. They have stout, longish bills and webbed feet. Terns are a group of generally medium to large seabirds typically with grey or white plumage, often with black markings on the head. Most terns hunt fish by diving but some pick insects off the surface of fresh water. Terns are generally long-lived birds, with several species known to live in excess of 30 years. Skimmers are a small family of tropical tern-like birds. They have an elongated lower mandible which they use to feed by flying low over the water surface and skimming the water for small fish.

Sabine's gull, Xema sabini
Gray-hooded gull, Chroicocephalus cirrocephalus (A)
Black-headed gull, Chroicocephalus ridibundus
White-eyed gull, Ichthyaetus leucophthalmus
Sooty gull, Ichthyaetus hemprichii
Pallas's gull, Ichthyaetus ichthyaetus (A)
Caspian gull, Larus cachinnans
Lesser black-backed gull, Larus fuscus
Brown noddy, Anous stolidus
Lesser noddy, Anous tenuirostris
Sooty tern, Onychoprion fuscatus
Bridled tern, Onychoprion anaethetus
Little tern, Sternula albifrons
Saunders's tern, Sternula saundersi
Gull-billed tern, Gelochelidon nilotica
Caspian tern, Hydroprogne caspia
Black tern, Chlidonias niger (A)
White-winged tern, Chlidonias leucopterus
Whiskered tern, Chlidonias hybrida
Roseate tern, Sterna dougallii
Common tern, Sterna hirundo
Arctic tern, Sterna paradisaea
White-cheeked tern, Sterna repressa
Great crested tern, Thalasseus bergii
Sandwich tern, Thalasseus sandvicensis
Lesser crested tern, Thalasseus bengalensis
African skimmer, Rynchops flavirostris (A)

Tropicbirds
Order: PhaethontiformesFamily: Phaethontidae

Tropicbirds are slender white birds of tropical oceans, with exceptionally long central tail feathers. Their heads and long wings have black markings.

Red-billed tropicbird, Phaethon aethereus

Albatrosses
Order: ProcellariiformesFamily: Diomedeidae

The albatrosses are among the largest of flying birds, and the great albatrosses from the genus Diomedea have the largest wingspans of any extant birds.

White-capped albatross, Thalassarche cauta (A)

Southern storm-petrels
Order: ProcellariiformesFamily: Oceanitidae

The southern storm-petrels are relatives of the petrels and are the smallest seabirds. They feed on planktonic crustaceans and small fish picked from the surface, typically while hovering. The flight is fluttering and sometimes bat-like.

Wilson's storm-petrel, Oceanites oceanicus
White-faced storm-petrel, Pelagodroma marina (A)
Black-bellied storm-petrel, Fregetta tropica (A)

Northern storm-petrels
Order: ProcellariiformesFamily: Hydrobatidae

Though the members of this family are similar in many respects to the southern storm-petrels, including their general appearance and habits, there are enough genetic differences to warrant their placement in a separate family.

Swinhoe's storm-petrel, Hydrobates monorhis

Shearwaters and petrels
Order: ProcellariiformesFamily: Procellariidae

The procellariids are the main group of medium-sized "true petrels", characterised by united nostrils with medium septum and a long outer functional primary.

Cape petrel, Daption capense (A)
Kerguelen petrel, Aphrodroma brevirostris (A)
Antarctic prion, Pachyptila desolata (A)
Jouanin's petrel, Bulweria fallax
Flesh-footed shearwater, Ardenna carneipes (A)
Wedge-tailed shearwater, Ardenna pacificus
Tropical shearwater, Puffinus bailloni
Persian shearwater, Puffinus persicus

Storks
Order: CiconiiformesFamily: Ciconiidae

Storks are large, long-legged, long-necked, wading birds with long, stout bills. Storks are mute, but bill-clattering is an important mode of communication at the nest. Their nests can be large and may be reused for many years. Many species are migratory.

African openbill, Anastomus lamelligerus
Black stork, Ciconia nigra (A)
Abdim's stork, Ciconia abdimii
African woolly-necked stork, Ciconia microscelis
White stork, Ciconia ciconia
Saddle-billed stork, Ephippiorhynchus senegalensis
Marabou stork, Leptoptilos crumenifer
Yellow-billed stork, Mycteria ibis

Frigatebirds
Order: SuliformesFamily: Fregatidae

Frigatebirds are large seabirds usually found over tropical oceans. They are large, black-and-white or completely black, with long wings and deeply forked tails. The males have coloured inflatable throat pouches. They do not swim or walk and cannot take off from a flat surface. Having the largest wingspan-to-body-weight ratio of any bird, they are essentially aerial, able to stay aloft for more than a week.

Lesser frigatebird, Fregata ariel (A)
Great frigatebird, Fregata minor

Boobies and gannets
Order: SuliformesFamily: Sulidae

The sulids comprise the gannets and boobies. Both groups are medium to large coastal seabirds that plunge-dive for fish.

Masked booby, Sula dactylatra
Brown booby, Sula leucogaster
Red-footed booby, Sula sula (A)

Anhingas
Order: SuliformesFamily: Anhingidae

Anhingas or darters are often called "snake-birds" because of their long thin neck, which gives a snake-like appearance when they swim with their bodies submerged. The males have black and dark-brown plumage, an erectile crest on the nape and a larger bill than the female. The females have much paler plumage especially on the neck and underparts. The darters have completely webbed feet and their legs are short and set far back on the body. Their plumage is somewhat permeable, like that of cormorants, and they spread their wings to dry after diving.

African darter, Anhinga melanogaster

Cormorants and shags
Order: SuliformesFamily: Phalacrocoracidae

Phalacrocoracidae is a family of medium to large coastal, fish-eating seabirds that includes cormorants and shags. Plumage colouration varies, with the majority having mainly dark plumage, some species being black-and-white and a few being colourful.

Long-tailed cormorant, Microcarbo africanus
Great cormorant, Phalacrocorax carbo
Socotra cormorant, Phalacrocorax nigrogularis

Pelicans
Order: PelecaniformesFamily: Pelecanidae

Pelicans are large water birds with a distinctive pouch under their beak. As with other members of the order Pelecaniformes, they have webbed feet with four toes.

Great white pelican, Pelecanus onocrotalus
Pink-backed pelican, Pelecanus rufescens

Hammerkop
Order: PelecaniformesFamily: Scopidae

The hammerkop is a medium-sized bird with a long shaggy crest. The shape of its head with a curved bill and crest at the back is reminiscent of a hammer, hence its name. Its plumage is drab-brown all over.

Hamerkop, Scopus umbretta

Herons, egrets, and bitterns
Order: PelecaniformesFamily: Ardeidae

The family Ardeidae contains the bitterns, herons and egrets. Herons and egrets are medium to large wading birds with long necks and legs. Bitterns tend to be shorter necked and more wary. Members of Ardeidae fly with their necks retracted, unlike other long-necked birds such as storks, ibises and spoonbills.

Little bittern, Ixobrychus minutus
Dwarf bittern, Ixobrychus sturmii
Gray heron, Ardea cinerea (A)
Black-headed heron, Ardea melanocephala
Goliath heron, Ardea goliath
Purple heron, Ardea purpurea
Great egret, Ardea alba
Intermediate egret, Ardea intermedia
Little egret, Egretta garzetta
Western reef-heron, Egretta gularis
Black heron, Egretta ardesiaca
Cattle egret, Bubulcus ibis
Squacco heron, Ardeola ralloides
Malagasy pond-heron, Ardeola idae (A)
Striated heron, Butorides striata
Black-crowned night-heron, Nycticorax nycticorax

Ibises and spoonbills
Order: PelecaniformesFamily: Threskiornithidae

Threskiornithidae is a family of large terrestrial and wading birds which includes the ibises and spoonbills. They have long, broad wings with 11 primary and about 20 secondary feathers. They are strong fliers and despite their size and weight, very capable soarers.

Glossy ibis, Plegadis falcinellus
African sacred ibis, Threskiornis aethiopicus
Northern bald ibis, Geronticus eremita (A)
Hadada ibis, Bostrychia hagedash
Eurasian spoonbill, Platalea leucorodia
African spoonbill, Platalea alba

Secretarybird
Order: AccipitriformesFamily: Sagittariidae

The secretarybird is a bird of prey in the order Accipitriformes but is easily distinguished from other raptors by its long crane-like legs.

Secretarybird, Sagittarius serpentarius

Osprey
Order: AccipitriformesFamily: Pandionidae

The family Pandionidae contains only one species, the osprey. The osprey is a medium-large raptor which is a specialist fish-eater with a worldwide distribution.

Osprey, Pandion haliaetus

Hawks, eagles, and kites
Order: AccipitriformesFamily: Accipitridae

Accipitridae is a family of birds of prey, which includes hawks, eagles, kites, harriers and Old World vultures. These birds have powerful hooked beaks for tearing flesh from their prey, strong legs, powerful talons and keen eyesight.

Black-winged kite, Elanus caeruleus
Scissor-tailed kite, Chelictinia riocourii
African harrier-hawk, Polyboroides typus
Egyptian vulture, Neophron percnopterus
European honey-buzzard, Pernis apivorus (A)
African cuckoo-hawk, Aviceda cuculoides
White-headed vulture, Trigonoceps occipitalis
Lappet-faced vulture, Torgos tracheliotos
Hooded vulture, Necrosyrtes monachus
White-backed vulture, Gyps africanus
Rüppell's griffon, Gyps rueppelli
Eurasian griffon, Gyps fulvus (A)
Bateleur, Terathopius ecaudatus
Short-toed snake-eagle, Circaetus gallicus (A)
Black-chested snake-eagle, Circaetus pectoralis
Brown snake-eagle, Circaetus cinereus
Fasciated snake-eagle, Circaetus fasciolatus
Bat hawk, Macheiramphus alcinus
Martial eagle, Polemaetus bellicosus
Long-crested eagle, Lophaetus occipitalis
Wahlberg's eagle, Hieraaetus wahlbergi
Booted eagle, Hieraaetus pennatus
Ayres's hawk-eagle, Hieraaetus ayresii (A)
Tawny eagle, Aquila rapax
Steppe eagle, Aquila nipalensis (A)
Verreaux's eagle, Aquila verreauxii
Bonelli's eagle, Aquila fasciata (A)
African hawk-eagle, Aquila spilogaster
Lizard buzzard, Kaupifalco monogrammicus
Eastern chanting-goshawk, Melierax poliopterus
Gabar goshawk, Micronisus gabar
Grasshopper buzzard, Butastur rufipennis
Eurasian marsh-harrier, Circus aeruginosus
African marsh-harrier, Circus ranivorus (A)
Pallid harrier, Circus macrourus
Montagu's harrier, Circus pygargus
African goshawk, Accipiter tachiro
Shikra, Accipiter badius
Little sparrowhawk, Accipiter minullus
Eurasian sparrowhawk, Accipiter nisus (A)
Black goshawk, Accipiter melanoleucus (A)
Black kite, Milvus migrans
African fish-eagle, Haliaeetus vocifer
Common buzzard, Buteo buteo (A)
Long-legged buzzard, Buteo rufinus (A)
Augur buzzard, Buteo augur

Barn-owls
Order: StrigiformesFamily: Tytonidae

Barn-owls are medium to large owls with large heads and characteristic heart-shaped faces. They have long strong legs with powerful talons. 

Barn owl, Tyto alba

Owls
Order: StrigiformesFamily: Strigidae

The typical owls are small to large solitary nocturnal birds of prey. They have large forward-facing eyes and ears, a hawk-like beak and a conspicuous circle of feathers around each eye called a facial disk.

Eurasian scops-owl, Otus scops
African scops-owl, Otus senegalensis
Northern white-faced owl, Ptilopsis leucotis
Grayish eagle-owl, Bubo cinerascens
Verreaux's eagle-owl, Bubo lacteus
Pel's fishing-owl, Scotopelia peli
Pearl-spotted owlet, Glaucidium perlatum
African barred owlet, Glaucidium capense
Little owl, Athene noctua
African wood-owl, Strix woodfordii

Mousebirds
Order: ColiiformesFamily: Coliidae

The mousebirds are slender greyish or brown birds with soft, hairlike body feathers and very long thin tails. They are arboreal and scurry through the leaves like rodents in search of berries, fruit and buds. They are acrobatic and can feed upside down. All species have strong claws and reversible outer toes. They also have crests and stubby bills.

Speckled mousebird, Colius striatus
White-headed mousebird, Colius leucocephalus
Blue-naped mousebird, Urocolius macrourus

Trogons
Order: TrogoniformesFamily: Trogonidae

The family Trogonidae includes trogons and quetzals. Found in tropical woodlands worldwide, they feed on insects and fruit, and their broad bills and weak legs reflect their diet and arboreal habits. Although their flight is fast, they are reluctant to fly any distance. Trogons have soft, often colourful, feathers with distinctive male and female plumage. 

Narina trogon, Apaloderma narina

Hoopoes
Order: BucerotiformesFamily: Upupidae

Hoopoes have black, white and orangey-pink colouring with a large erectile crest on their head. 

Eurasian hoopoe, Upupa epops

Woodhoopoes and scimitarbills
Order: BucerotiformesFamily: Phoeniculidae

The woodhoopoes are related to the kingfishers, rollers and hoopoes. They most resemble the hoopoes with their long curved bills, used to probe for insects, and short rounded wings. However, they differ in that they have metallic plumage, often blue, green or purple, and lack an erectile crest. 

Green woodhoopoe, Phoeniculus purpureus (A)
Black-billed woodhoopoe, Phoeniculus somaliensis
Black scimitarbill, Rhinopomastus aterrimus
Common scimitarbill, Rhinopomastus cyanomelas
Abyssinian scimitarbill, Rhinopomastus minor

Ground-hornbills
Order: BucerotiformesFamily: Bucorvidae

The ground-hornbills are terrestrial birds which feed almost entirely on insects, other birds, snakes, and amphibians.

Abyssinian ground-hornbill, Bucorvus abyssinicus

Hornbills
Order: BucerotiformesFamily: Bucerotidae

Hornbills are a group of birds whose bill is shaped like a cow's horn, but without a twist, sometimes with a casque on the upper mandible. Frequently, the bill is brightly coloured.

Crowned hornbill, Lophoceros alboterminatus
Hemprich's hornbill, Lophoceros hemprichii
African gray hornbill, Lophoceros nasutus
Eastern yellow-billed hornbill, Tockus flavirostris
Von der Decken's hornbill, Tockus deckeni
Northern red-billed hornbill, Tockus erythrorhynchus

Kingfishers
Order: CoraciiformesFamily: Alcedinidae

Kingfishers are medium-sized birds with large heads, long, pointed bills, short legs and stubby tails.

Malachite kingfisher, Corythornis cristatus
African pygmy kingfisher, Ispidina picta
Gray-headed kingfisher, Halcyon leucocephala
Mangrove kingfisher, Halcyon senegaloides
Brown-hooded kingfisher, Halcyon albiventris
Striped kingfisher, Halcyon chelicuti
Collared kingfisher, Todirhamphus chloris
Pied kingfisher, Ceryle rudis

Bee-eaters
Order: CoraciiformesFamily: Meropidae

The bee-eaters are a group of near passerine birds in the family Meropidae. Most species are found in Africa but others occur in southern Europe, Madagascar, Australia and New Guinea. They are characterised by richly coloured plumage, slender bodies and usually elongated central tail feathers. All are colourful and have long downturned bills and pointed wings, which give them a swallow-like appearance when seen from afar. 

Little bee-eater, Merops pusillus
Somali bee-eater, Merops revoilii
White-throated bee-eater, Merops albicollis
Blue-cheeked bee-eater, Merops persicus
Madagascar bee-eater, Merops superciliosus
European bee-eater, Merops apiaster
Northern carmine bee-eater, Merops nubicus

Rollers
Order: CoraciiformesFamily: Coraciidae

Rollers resemble crows in size and build, but are more closely related to the kingfishers and bee-eaters. They share the colourful appearance of those groups with blues and browns predominating. The two inner front toes are connected, but the outer toe is not.

European roller, Coracias garrulus
Abyssinian roller, Coracias abyssinica (A)
Lilac-breasted roller, Coracias caudata
Rufous-crowned roller, Coracias naevia
Broad-billed roller, Eurystomus glaucurus

African barbets
Order: PiciformesFamily: Lybiidae

The African barbets are plump birds, with short necks and large heads. They get their name from the bristles which fringe their heavy bills. Most species are brightly coloured.

Red-and-yellow barbet, Trachyphonus erythrocephalus
Yellow-breasted barbet, Trachyphonus margaritatus
D'Arnaud's barbet, Trachyphonus darnaudii
Red-fronted tinkerbird, Pogoniulus pusillus
Black-throated barbet, Tricholaema melanocephala
Brown-breasted barbet, Lybius melanopterus

Honeyguides
Order: PiciformesFamily: Indicatoridae

Honeyguides are among the few birds that feed on wax. They are named for the greater honeyguide which leads traditional honey-hunters to bees' nests and, after the hunters have harvested the honey, feeds on the remaining contents of the hive.

Wahlberg's honeyguide, Prodotiscus regulus (A)
Lesser honeyguide, Indicator minor
Scaly-throated honeyguide, Indicator variegatus
Greater honeyguide, Indicator indicator

Woodpeckers
Order: PiciformesFamily: Picidae

Woodpeckers are small to medium-sized birds with chisel-like beaks, short legs, stiff tails and long tongues used for capturing insects. Some species have feet with two toes pointing forward and two backward, while several species have only three toes. Many woodpeckers have the habit of tapping noisily on tree trunks with their beaks.

Eurasian wryneck, Jynx torquilla (A)
Cardinal woodpecker, Dendropicos fuscescens
Bearded woodpecker, Chloropicus namaquus
Green-backed woodpecker, Campethera cailliautii
Nubian woodpecker, Campethera nubica
Mombasa woodpecker, Campethera mombassica

Falcons and caracaras
Order: FalconiformesFamily: Falconidae

Falconidae is a family of diurnal birds of prey. They differ from hawks, eagles and kites in that they kill with their beaks instead of their talons. 

Pygmy falcon, Polihierax semitorquatus
Lesser kestrel, Falco naumanni
Eurasian kestrel, Falco tinnunculus
Greater kestrel, Falco rupicoloides
Red-necked falcon, Falco chicquera (A)
Red-footed falcon, Falco vespertinus (A)
Amur falcon, Falco amurensis
Eleonora's falcon, Falco eleonorae
Sooty falcon, Falco concolor
Eurasian hobby, Falco subbuteo
African hobby, Falco cuvierii (A)
Lanner falcon, Falco biarmicus
Peregrine falcon, Falco peregrinus

Old World parrots
Order: PsittaciformesFamily: Psittaculidae

Characteristic features of parrots include a strong curved bill, an upright stance, strong legs, and clawed zygodactyl feet. Many parrots are vividly colored, and some are multi-colored. Old World parrots are found from Africa east across south and southeast Asia and Oceania to Australia and New Zealand.

Rose-ringed parakeet, Psittacula krameri (A)

African and New World parrots
Order: PsittaciformesFamily: Psittacidae

Characteristic features of parrots include a strong curved bill, an upright stance, strong legs, and clawed zygodactyl feet. Many parrots are vividly colored, and some are multi-colored. Most of the more than 150 species in this family are found in the New World.

Red-bellied parrot, Poicephalus rufiventris

Cuckooshrikes
Order: PasseriformesFamily: Campephagidae

The cuckooshrikes are small to medium-sized passerine birds. They are predominantly greyish with white and black, although some species are brightly coloured. 

Black cuckooshrike, Campephaga flava

Old World orioles
Order: PasseriformesFamily: Oriolidae

The Old World orioles are colourful passerine birds. They are not related to the New World orioles. 

Eurasian golden oriole, Oriolus oriolus
African golden oriole, Oriolus auratus
African black-headed oriole, Oriolus larvatus

Wattle-eyes and batises
Order: PasseriformesFamily: Platysteiridae

The wattle-eyes, or puffback flycatchers, are small stout passerine birds of the African tropics. They get their name from the brightly coloured fleshy eye decorations found in most species in this group.

Black-throated wattle-eye, Platysteira peltata
Gray-headed batis, Batis orientalis
Western black-headed batis, Batis erlangeri
Eastern black-headed batis, Batis minor
Pygmy batis, Batis perkeo

Vangas, helmetshrikes, and allies
Order: PasseriformesFamily: Vangidae

The helmetshrikes are similar in build to the shrikes, but tend to be colourful species with distinctive crests or other head ornaments, such as wattles, from which they get their name.

White helmetshrike, Prionops plumatus
Retz's helmetshrike, Prionops retzii
Chestnut-fronted helmetshrike, Prionops scopifrons

Bushshrikes and allies
Order: PasseriformesFamily: Malaconotidae

Bushshrikes are similar in habits to shrikes, hunting insects and other small prey from a perch on a bush. Although similar in build to the shrikes, these tend to be either colourful species or largely black; some species are quite secretive.

Brubru, Nilaus afer
Northern puffback, Dryoscopus gambensis
Pringle's puffback, Dryoscopus pringlii
Black-backed puffback, Dryoscopus cubla
Black-crowned tchagra, Tchagra senegala
Three-streaked tchagra, Tchagra jamesi
Red-naped bushshrike, Laniarius ruficeps
Coastal boubou, Laniarius nigerrimus (E)
Ethiopian boubou, Laniarius aethiopicus
Zanzibar boubou, Laniarius sublacteus
Slate-colored boubou, Laniarius funebris
Rosy-patched bushshrike, Rhodophoneus cruentus
Sulphur-breasted bushshrike, Telophorus sulfureopectus
Four-colored bushshrike, Telophorus viridis
Gray-headed bushshrike, Malaconotus blanchoti

Drongos
Order: PasseriformesFamily: Dicruridae

The drongos are mostly black or dark grey in colour, sometimes with metallic tints. They have long forked tails, and some Asian species have elaborate tail decorations. They have short legs and sit very upright when perched, like a shrike. They flycatch or take prey from the ground.

Common square-tailed drongo, Dicrurus ludwigii
Fork-tailed drongo, Dicrurus adsimilis
Glossy-backed drongo, Dicrurus divaricatus

Monarch flycatchers
Order: PasseriformesFamily: Monarchidae

The monarch flycatchers are small to medium-sized insectivorous passerines which hunt by flycatching.

African crested-flycatcher, Trochocercus cyanomelas
African paradise-flycatcher, Terpsiphone viridis

Shrikes
Order: PasseriformesFamily: Laniidae

Shrikes are passerine birds known for their habit of catching other birds and small animals and impaling the uneaten portions of their bodies on thorns. A typical shrike's beak is hooked, like a bird of prey.

Red-backed shrike, Lanius collurio
Red-tailed shrike, Lanius phoenicuroides
Isabelline shrike, Lanius isabellinus
Great gray shrike, Lanius excubitor
Lesser gray shrike, Lanius minor
Long-tailed fiscal, Lanius cabanisi
Taita fiscal, Lanius dorsalis
Somali fiscal, Lanius somalicus
Masked shrike, Lanius nubicus (A)
Woodchat shrike, Lanius senator (A)
White-rumped shrike, Eurocephalus ruppelli

Crows, jays, and magpies
Order: PasseriformesFamily: Corvidae

The family Corvidae includes crows, ravens, jays, choughs, magpies, treepies, nutcrackers and ground jays. Corvids are above average in size among the Passeriformes, and some of the larger species show high levels of intelligence.

House crow, Corvus splendens (I)
Cape crow, Corvus capensis
Pied crow, Corvus albus
Brown-necked raven, Corvus ruficollis (A)
Somali crow, Corvus edithae
Fan-tailed raven, Corvus rhipidurus
Thick-billed raven, Corvus crassirostris (A)

Tits, chickadees and titmice
Order: PasseriformesFamily: Paridae

The Paridae are mainly small stocky woodland species with short stout bills. Some have crests. They are adaptable birds, with a mixed diet including seeds and insects. 

Somali tit, Melaniparus thruppi

Penduline-tits
Order: PasseriformesFamily: Remizidae

The penduline-tits are a group of small passerine birds related to the true tits. They are insectivores.

Mouse-coloured penduline-tit, Anthoscopus musculus

Larks
Order: PasseriformesFamily: Alaudidae

Larks are small terrestrial birds with often extravagant songs and display flights. Most larks are fairly dull in appearance. Their food is insects and seeds.

Greater hoopoe-lark, Alaemon alaudipes
Lesser hoopoe-lark, Alaemon hamertoni (E)
Desert lark, Ammomanes deserti
Chestnut-backed sparrow-lark, Eremopterix leucotis
Black-crowned sparrow-lark, Eremopterix nigriceps
Chestnut-headed sparrow-lark, Eremopterix signata
Pink-breasted lark, Calendulauda poecilosterna
Fawn-colored lark, Calendulauda africanoides
Liben lark, Heteromirafra archeri
Collared lark, Mirafra collaris
Red-winged lark, Mirafra hypermetra
Rufous-naped lark, Mirafra africana
Ash's lark, Mirafra ashi (E)
Somali long-billed lark, Mirafra somalica
Flappet lark, Mirafra rufocinnamomea
Horsfield’s bushlark, Mirafra javanica
Gillett's lark, Mirafra gilletti
Rufous-capped lark, Calandrella eremica
Greater short-toed lark, Calandrella brachydactyla
Somali short-toed lark, Alaudala somalica
Short-tailed lark, Spizocorys fremantlii
Obbia lark, Spizocorys obbiensis (E)
Thekla's lark, Galerida theklae
Crested lark, Galerida cristata

Nicators
Order: PasseriformesFamily: Nicatoridae

The nicators are shrike-like, with hooked bills. They are endemic to sub-Saharan Africa.

Eastern nicator, Nicator gularis

African warblers
Order: PasseriformesFamily: Macrosphenidae

African warblers are small to medium-sized insectivores which are found in a wide variety of habitats south of the Sahara.

Northern crombec, Sylvietta brachyura
Short-billed crombec, Sylvietta philippae
Somali crombec, Sylvietta isabellina

Cisticolas and allies
Order: PasseriformesFamily: Cisticolidae

The Cisticolidae are warblers found mainly in warmer southern regions of the Old World. They are generally very small birds of drab brown or grey appearance found in open country such as grassland or scrub.

Yellow-vented eremomela, Eremomela flavicrissalis
Yellow-bellied eremomela, Eremomela icteropygialis
Gray wren-warbler, Calamonastes simplex
Green-backed camaroptera, Camaroptera brachyura
Yellow-breasted apalis, Apalis flavida
Black-headed apalis, Apalis melanocephala
Graceful prinia, Prinia gracilis
Tawny-flanked prinia, Prinia subflava
Pale prinia, Prinia somalica
Red-fronted prinia, Prinia rufifrons
Ashy cisticola, Cisticola cinereolus
Coastal cisticola, Cisticola haematocephalus
Croaking cisticola, Cisticola natalensis
Siffling cisticola, Cisticola brachypterus
Tiny cisticola, Cisticola nana
Zitting cisticola, Cisticola juncidis
Desert cisticola, Cisticola aridulus
Pectoral-patch cisticola, Cisticola brunnescens

Reed warblers and allies
Order: PasseriformesFamily: Acrocephalidae

The members of this family are usually rather large for "warblers". Most are rather plain olivaceous brown above with much yellow to beige below. They are usually found in open woodland, reedbeds, or tall grass. The family occurs mostly in southern to western Eurasia and surroundings, but it also ranges far into the Pacific, with some species in Africa.

Booted warbler, Iduna caligata
Sykes's warbler, Iduna rama
Eastern olivaceous warbler, Iduna pallida
Upcher's warbler, Hippolais languida
Olive-tree warbler, Hippolais olivetorum (A)
Icterine warbler, Hippolais icterina (A)
Sedge warbler, Acrocephalus schoenobaenus
Marsh warbler, Acrocephalus palustris
Common reed warbler, Acrocephalus scirpaceus
Basra reed warbler, Acrocephalus griseldis
Lesser swamp warbler, Acrocephalus gracilirostris
Great reed warbler, Acrocephalus arundinaceus (A)
Clamorous reed warbler, Acrocephalus stentoreus

Grassbirds and allies
Order: PasseriformesFamily: Locustellidae

Locustellidae are a family of small insectivorous songbirds found mainly in Eurasia, Africa, and the Australian region. They are smallish birds with tails that are usually long and pointed, and tend to be drab brownish or buffy all over.

River warbler, Locustella fluviatilis (A)

Swallows
Order: PasseriformesFamily: Hirundinidae

The family Hirundinidae is adapted to aerial feeding. They have a slender streamlined body, long pointed wings and a short bill with a wide gape. The feet are adapted to perching rather than walking, and the front toes are partially joined at the base.

Plain martin, Riparia paludicola (A)
Bank swallow, Riparia riparia
Banded martin, Neophedina cincta (A)
Rock martin, Ptyonoprogne fuligula
Barn swallow, Hirundo rustica
Ethiopian swallow, Hirundo aethiopica
Wire-tailed swallow, Hirundo smithii
Red-rumped swallow, Cecropis daurica
Lesser striped swallow, Cecropis abyssinica
Mosque swallow, Cecropis senegalensis (A)
Common house-martin, Delichon urbicum

Bulbuls
Order: PasseriformesFamily: Pycnonotidae

Bulbuls are medium-sized songbirds. Some are colourful with yellow, red or orange vents, cheeks, throats or supercilia, but most are drab, with uniform olive-brown to black plumage. Some species have distinct crests.

Sombre greenbul, Andropadus importunus
Yellow-bellied greenbul, Chlorocichla flaviventris
Terrestrial brownbul, Phyllastrephus terrestris
Northern brownbul, Phyllastrephus strepitans
Fischer's greenbul, Phyllastrephus fischeri
Common bulbul, Pycnonotus barbatus

Leaf warblers
Order: PasseriformesFamily: Phylloscopidae

Leaf warblers are a family of small insectivorous birds found mostly in Eurasia and ranging into Wallacea and Africa. The species are of various sizes, often green-plumaged above and yellow below, or more subdued with greyish-green to greyish-brown colours.

Wood warbler, Phylloscopus sibilatrix
Willow warbler, Phylloscopus trochilus
Common chiffchaff, Phylloscopus collybita
Brown woodland-warbler, Phylloscopus umbrovirens

Bush warblers and allies
Order: PasseriformesFamily: Scotocercidae

The members of this family are found throughout Africa, Asia, and Polynesia. Their taxonomy is in flux, and some authorities place genus Erythrocerus in another family.

Yellow flycatcher, Erythrocercus holochlorus

Sylviid warblers, parrotbills, and allies 
Order: PasseriformesFamily: Sylviidae

The family Sylviidae is a group of small insectivorous passerine birds. They mainly occur as breeding species, as the common name implies, in Europe, Asia and, to a lesser extent, Africa. Most are of generally undistinguished appearance, but many have distinctive songs.

Eurasian blackcap, Sylvia atricapilla
Garden warbler, Sylvia borin (A)
Barred warbler, Curruca nisoria
Banded parisoma, Curruca boehmi
Lesser whitethroat, Curruca curruca (A)
Arabian warbler, Curruca leucomelaena
Western Orphean warbler, Curruca hortensis
Asian desert warbler, Curruca nana
Menetries's warbler, Curruca mystacea
Eastern subalpine warbler, Curruca cantillans
Greater whitethroat, Curruca communis

White-eyes, yuhinas, and allies
Order: PasseriformesFamily: Zosteropidae

The white-eyes are small and mostly undistinguished, their plumage above being generally some dull colour like greenish-olive, but some species have a white or bright yellow throat, breast or lower parts, and several have buff flanks. As their name suggests, many species have a white ring around each eye.

Pale white-eye, Zosterops flavilateralis
Abyssinian white-eye, Zosterops abyssinicus
Socotra white-eye, Zosterops socotranus
Heuglin's white-eye, Zosterops poliogastrus

Laughingthrushes and allies
Order: PasseriformesFamily: Leiothrichidae

The laughingthrushes are somewhat diverse in size and colouration, but are characterised by soft fluffy plumage.

Rufous chatterer, Argya rubiginosa
Scaly chatterer, Argya aylmeri
White-rumped babbler, Turdoides leucopygia
Scaly babbler, Turdoides squamulata

Oxpeckers
Order: PasseriformesFamily: Buphagidae

As both the English and scientific names of these birds imply, they feed on ectoparasites, primarily ticks, found on large mammals.

Red-billed oxpecker, Buphagus erythrorynchus

Starlings
Order: PasseriformesFamily: Sturnidae

Starlings are small to medium-sized passerine birds. Their flight is strong and direct and they are very gregarious. Their preferred habitat is fairly open country. They eat insects and fruit. Plumage is typically dark with a metallic sheen.

European starling, Sturnus vulgaris (A)
Wattled starling, Creatophora cinerea
Violet-backed starling, Cinnyricinclus leucogaster
Bristle-crowned starling, Onychognathus salva
Somali starling, Onychognathus blythii
Magpie starling, Speculipastor bicolor
Black-bellied starling, Notopholia corrusca
Shelley's starling, Lamprotornis shelleyi
Rüppell's starling, Lamprotornis purpuropterus
Golden-breasted starling, Lamprotornis regius
Superb starling, Lamprotornis superbus
White-crowned starling, Lamprotornis albicapillus
Fischer's starling, Lamprotornis fischeri
Greater blue-eared starling, Lamprotornis chalybaeus

Thrushes and allies
Order: PasseriformesFamily: Turdidae

The thrushes are a group of passerine birds that occur mainly in the Old World. They are plump, soft plumaged, small to medium-sized insectivores or sometimes omnivores, often feeding on the ground. Many have attractive songs.

Red-tailed ant-thrush, Neocossyphus rufus
Somali thrush, Turdus ludoviciae (E)
African bare-eyed thrush, Turdus tephronotus

Old World flycatchers
Order: PasseriformesFamily: Muscicapidae

Old World flycatchers are a large group of small passerine birds native to the Old World. They are mainly small arboreal insectivores. The appearance of these birds is highly varied, but they mostly have weak songs and harsh calls.

Spotted flycatcher, Muscicapa striata
Gambaga flycatcher, Muscicapa gambagae
African gray flycatcher, Bradornis microrhynchus
Pale flycatcher, Agricola pallidus
Ashy flycatcher, Fraseria caerulescens
Southern black-flycatcher, Melaenornis pammelaina
Bearded scrub-robin, Cercotrichas quadrivirgata
Black scrub-robin, Cercotrichas podobe
Rufous-tailed scrub-robin, Cercotrichas galactotes
Red-backed scrub-robin, Cercotrichas leucophrys
White-browed robin-chat, Cossypha heuglini
Red-capped robin-chat, Cossypha natalensis
Spotted morning-thrush, Cichladusa guttata
White-throated robin, Irania gutturalis
Thrush nightingale, Luscinia luscinia (A)
Common nightingale, Luscinia megarhynchos
Semicollared flycatcher, Ficedula semitorquata (A)
Common redstart, Phoenicurus phoenicurus
Black redstart, Phoenicurus ochruros
Little rock-thrush, Monticola rufocinereus
Rufous-tailed rock-thrush, Monticola saxatilis
Blue rock-thrush, Monticola solitarius
Whinchat, Saxicola rubetra
European stonechat, Saxicola rubicola
African stonechat, Saxicola torquatus
Northern wheatear, Oenanthe oenanthe
Capped wheatear, Oenanthe pileata (A)
Red-breasted wheatear, Oenanthe bottae (A)
Isabelline wheatear, Oenanthe isabellina
Heuglin's wheatear, Oenanthe heuglini (A)
Desert wheatear, Oenanthe deserti
Eastern black-eared wheatear, Oenanthe melanoleuca (A)
Pied wheatear, Oenanthe pleschanka
Somali wheatear, Oenanthe phillipsi
Blackstart, Oenanthe melanura
Sombre rock chat, Oenanthe dubia
Brown-tailed chat, Oenanthe scotocerca
Abyssinian wheatear, Oenanthe lugubris'
Mourning wheatear, Oenanthe lugensKurdish wheatear, Oenanthe xanthoprymna (A)

Sunbirds and spiderhunters
Order: PasseriformesFamily: Nectariniidae

The sunbirds and spiderhunters are very small passerine birds which feed largely on nectar, although they will also take insects, especially when feeding young. Flight is fast and direct on their short wings. Most species can take nectar by hovering like a hummingbird, but usually perch to feed.

Eastern violet-backed sunbird, Anthreptes orientalisCollared sunbird, Hedydipna collarisNile Valley sunbird, Hedydipna metallicaOlive sunbird, Cyanomitra olivaceaMouse-coloured sunbird, Cyanomitra veroxiiAmethyst sunbird, Chalcomitra amethystinaHunter's sunbird, Chalcomitra hunteriMariqua sunbird, Cinnyris mariquensisBlack-bellied sunbird, Cinnyris nectarinioidesPurple-banded sunbird, Cinnyris bifasciatusTsavo sunbird, Cinnyris tsavoensisViolet-breasted sunbird, Cinnyris chalcomelasShining sunbird, Cinnyris habessinicusVariable sunbird, Cinnyris venustusdorii

Weavers and allies
Order: PasseriformesFamily: Ploceidae

The weavers are small passerine birds related to the finches. They are seed-eating birds with rounded conical bills. The males of many species are brightly coloured, usually in red or yellow and black, some species show variation in colour only in the breeding season.

Red-billed buffalo-weaver, Bubalornis niger
White-headed buffalo-weaver, Dinemellia dinemelli
Speckle-fronted weaver, Sporopipes frontalis (A)
White-browed sparrow-weaver, Plocepasser mahali
Donaldson-Smith's sparrow-weaver, Plocepasser donaldsoni
Gray-headed social-weaver, Pseudonigrita arnaudi
Black-capped social-weaver, Pseudonigrita cabanisi
Red-headed weaver, Anaplectes rubriceps
Red weaver, Anaplectes jubaensis
Black-necked weaver, Ploceus nigricollis
African golden-weaver, Ploceus subaureus
Golden palm weaver, Ploceus bojeri
Lesser masked-weaver, Ploceus intermedius
Vitelline masked-weaver, Ploceus vitellinus
Rüppell's weaver, Ploceus galbula
Speke's weaver, Ploceus spekei
Village weaver, Ploceus cucullatus
Salvadori's weaver, Ploceus dichrocephalus
Chestnut weaver, Ploceus rubiginosus
Forest weaver, Ploceus bicolor
Red-billed quelea, Quelea quelea
Northern red bishop, Euplectes franciscanus
Fire-fronted bishop, Euplectes diadematus
Fan-tailed widowbird, Euplectes axillaris
Grosbeak weaver, Amblyospiza albifrons

Waxbills and allies
Order: PasseriformesFamily: Estrildidae

The estrildid finches are small passerine birds of the Old World tropics and Australasia. They are gregarious and often colonial seed eaters with short thick but pointed bills. They are all similar in structure and habits, but have wide variation in plumage colours and patterns.

Gray-headed silverbill, Odontospiza caniceps (A)
Black-and-white mannikin, Spermestes bicolor
African silverbill, Euodice cantans
Black-cheeked waxbill, Brunhilda charmosyna
Common waxbill, Estrilda astrild
Crimson-rumped waxbill, Estrilda rhodopyga
Quailfinch, Ortygospiza atricollis (A)
Cut-throat, Amadina fasciata
Purple grenadier, Uraeginthus ianthinogaster
Red-cheeked cordonbleu, Uraeginthus bengalus
Blue-capped cordonbleu, Uraeginthus cyanocephalus
Green-winged pytilia, Pytilia melba
Peters's twinspot, Hypargos niveoguttatus
Red-billed firefinch, Lagonosticta senegala

Indigobirds
Order: PasseriformesFamily: Viduidae

The indigobirds are finch-like species which usually have black or indigo predominating in their plumage. All are brood parasites, which lay their eggs in the nests of estrildid finches. 

Pin-tailed whydah, Vidua macroura
Eastern paradise-whydah, Vidua paradisaea
Steel-blue whydah, Vidua hypocherina
Straw-tailed whydah, Vidua fischeri
Village indigobird, Vidua chalybeata

Old World sparrows
Order: PasseriformesFamily: Passeridae

Old World sparrows are small passerine birds. In general, sparrows tend to be small, plump, brown or grey birds with short tails and short powerful beaks. Sparrows are seed eaters, but they also consume small insects.

House sparrow, Passer domesticus (I)
Somali sparrow, Passer castanopterus
Shelley's rufous sparrow, Passer shelleyi
Swainson's sparrow, Passer swainsonii
Parrot-billed sparrow, Passer gongonensis
Arabian golden sparrow, Passer euchlorus
Chestnut sparrow, Passer eminibey
Yellow-spotted bush sparrow, Gymnoris pyrgita

Wagtails and pipits
Order: PasseriformesFamily: Motacillidae

Motacillidae is a family of small passerine birds with medium to long tails. They include the wagtails, longclaws and pipits. They are slender, ground feeding insectivores of open country.

Gray wagtail, Motacilla cinerea
Western yellow wagtail, Motacilla flava
African pied wagtail, Motacilla aguimp
White wagtail, Motacilla alba
African pipit, Anthus cinnamomeus
Long-billed pipit, Anthus similis
Tawny pipit, Anthus campestris
Plain-backed pipit, Anthus leucophrys
Malindi pipit, Anthus melindae
Tree pipit, Anthus trivialis
Red-throated pipit, Anthus cervinus
Golden pipit, Tmetothylacus tenellus
Pangani longclaw, Macronyx aurantiigula

Finches, euphonias, and allies
Order: PasseriformesFamily: Fringillidae

Finches are seed-eating passerine birds, that are small to moderately large and have a strong beak, usually conical and in some species very large. All have twelve tail feathers and nine primaries. These birds have a bouncing flight with alternating bouts of flapping and gliding on closed wings, and most sing well.

Somali grosbeak, Rhynchostruthus louisae (E)
Reichenow's seedeater, Crithagra reichenowi
White-bellied canary, Crithagra dorsostriatus
Northern grosbeak-canary, Crithagra donaldsoni
Brown-rumped seedeater, Crithagra tristriatus
Warsangli linnet, Linaria johannis (E)

Old World buntings
Order: PasseriformesFamily: Emberizidae

The emberizids are a large family of passerine birds. They are seed-eating birds with distinctively shaped bills. Many emberizid species have distinctive head patterns.

Ortolan bunting, Emberiza hortulana
Somali bunting, Emberiza poliopleura
Cinnamon-breasted bunting, Emberiza tahapisi
Striolated bunting, Emberiza striolata

See also
List of birds
Lists of birds by region

References

External links
Birds of Somali - World Institute for Conservation and Environment

Somalia
Somalia
Birds
Somalia